Palmer Township is one of the fifteen townships of Putnam County, Ohio, United States.  The 2000 census found 1,143 people in the township, 1,007 of whom lived in the unincorporated portions of the township.

Geography
Located in the northern part of the county, it borders the following townships:
Pleasant Township, Henry County - north
Marion Township, Henry County - northeast corner
Liberty Township - east
Ottawa Township - southeast corner
Greensburg Township - south
Perry Township - southwest corner
Monroe Township - west
Highland Township, Defiance County - northwest corner

The village of Miller City is located in southeastern Palmer Township.

Name and history
Palmer Township was organized in 1854. It was named for a local judge. Statewide, the only other Palmer Township is located in Washington County.

Government
The township is governed by a three-member board of trustees, who are elected in November of odd-numbered years to a four-year term beginning on the following January 1. Two are elected in the year after the presidential election and one is elected in the year before it. There is also an elected township fiscal officer, who serves a four-year term beginning on April 1 of the year after the election, which is held in November of the year before the presidential election. Vacancies in the fiscal officership or on the board of trustees are filled by the remaining trustees.

References

External links
County website

Townships in Putnam County, Ohio
Townships in Ohio